Usko Nghihepavali Nghaamwa is a Namibian businessman, politician, and philanthropist. He's originally from Oipapakane Village in the Ohangwena Region. A member of SWAPO, Nghaamwa has been the Governor of the northern Ohangwena Region since 2005. In December 2010, he was reappointed to the position where he served until 2020. Nghaamwa is well known in the North of Namibia where he has donated to the communities by giving school infrastructure, food to the needy, scholarships, plus flood and drought aid.  In 2021, he donated one hundred thousand Namibian dollars to the new Nust campus to be constructed in Eenhana, in the Ohangwena region his home region. He also hosts an Usko Nghaamwa Marathon, with latest events having been hosted in collaboration with athlete Simon Shokonawa on 18 January 2022, his birthday.

References

Year of birth missing (living people)
Living people
People from Ohangwena Region
SWAPO politicians